Vladimir Gaćinović (born 3 January 1966) is a Serbian football manager and former player.

Career

Playing career
Born in Trebinje, SR Bosnia and Herzegovina, SFR Yugoslavia before the country's break-up, Gaćinović played in the Yugoslav Second League mostly with FK Leotar, but also a half-season with NK GOŠK Dubrovnik. In summer 1991 he signed with FK Bečej, having made 25 appearances and scored 5 goals. As player he played as forward. He played with Bečej until 1997.

Coaching career
After finishing his playing career, he became a coach. He was the assistant manager of Mile Jovin at Leotar in 2003–04 season, while next season he became the main coach of the team. In season 2010–11 he coached the under-17 side of FK Vojvodina. Between 2012 and 2014 he was back to Bosnia coaching Leotar and NK Zvijezda Gradačac. In between he had a short stint as coach in Montenegro coaching Igalo. In 2015 he accepted a call from major Lithuanian A Lyga side, FK Sūduva, which he coached in seasons 2015 and 2016.

Afterwards, he returned to Serbia and worked as the assistant manager at Serbian SuperLiga clubs Vojvodina and Spartak Subotica. In 2018, he was promoted to head coach of Spartak Subotica. Gaćinović led the team to an historical upset elimination of Sparta Prague in the second qualifying round for the 2018–19 UEFA Europa League. Spartak however went on to be eliminated in the third qualifying round by Brøndby.

On 6 June 2019, it was announced that Gačinović will once again be taking over the Spartak Subotica managerial position.

On 6 October 2021, he was hired as a manager of Spartak Subotica for the third time.

Personal life
His son is Serbian international footballer Mijat Gaćinović.

References

1966 births
Living people
People from Trebinje
Serbs of Bosnia and Herzegovina
Association football forwards
Yugoslav footballers
Bosnia and Herzegovina footballers
FK Leotar players
NK GOŠK Dubrovnik players
OFK Bečej 1918 players
Yugoslav Second League players
First League of Serbia and Montenegro players
Bosnia and Herzegovina football managers
FK Leotar managers
NK Zvijezda Gradačac managers
FK Sūduva Marijampolė managers
FK Spartak Subotica managers
FK Radnički Niš managers
Premier League of Bosnia and Herzegovina managers
Serbian SuperLiga managers
Bosnia and Herzegovina expatriate football managers
Expatriate football managers in Serbia
Bosnia and Herzegovina expatriate sportspeople in Serbia
Expatriate football managers in Montenegro
Bosnia and Herzegovina expatriate sportspeople in Montenegro
Expatriate football managers in Lithuania
Bosnia and Herzegovina expatriate sportspeople in Lithuania